The 1953 Texas Western Miners football team was an American football team that represented Texas Western College (now known as University of Texas at El Paso) as a member of the Border Conference during the 1953 college football season. In its fourth season under head coach Mike Brumbelow, the team compiled an 8–2 record (4–2 against Border Conference opponents), finished third in the conference, defeated  in the 1954 Sun Bowl, and outscored all opponents by a total of 257 to 144.

Schedule

References

Texas Western
UTEP Miners football seasons
Sun Bowl champion seasons
Texas Western Miners football